Hildegard Katarina Thorell, née Bergendal, 22 May 1850 –  2 February 1930, was a Swedish painter.

Biography

Thorell was born in Kroppa parish, Värmland County, Sweden. She was the daughter of August Filip Bergendahl and Hildegard Wennerlund.
In 1872 she married the auditor Oskar Reinhold Thorell. She studied at the Royal Swedish Academy of Fine Arts in Stockholm from 1876 to 1879, where she was the only married female student.  
She became an agré at the Royal Swedish Academy of Fine Arts in 1883 and was apprenticed to Bertha Wegmann. Later she travelled to Paris, where she studied with Léon Bonnat and Jean-Léon Gérôme.

Thorell mainly painted large portraits, for example Modersglädje (1894), Portrait of a Distinguished Young Lady (1880), Portrait of a Young Girl (1916), Painting of Fanny Brate (1918) and  Young woman with fan (1893).

References

Further reading
"Thorell, Hildegard Katarina" in Nordisk familjebok (second edition, 1919)

External links
 
 

1850 births
1930 deaths
19th-century Swedish painters
20th-century Swedish painters
Swedish women artists
20th-century Swedish women artists
19th-century Swedish women artists